Juan Claudio González Calderón (born 6 October 1975) is a former Chilean footballer, that played as centre back. Before joining Iquique, González had successful seasons with Audax Italiano and Universidad de Chile. At Audax was the most successful in the football career of González, during the 2007 season. The defender obtained important achievements in his career thanks to his coach in this time Raul Toro, who has also trained to González in Coquimbo Unido, which meant a share of trust very important. At Universidad de Chile, González started playing with a bad level, but then he broke into the starting lineup and won the confidence of the Uruguayan coaches: Sergio Markarián and Gerardo Pelusso, to such an extent of winning the 2009 Apertura Tournament and reach the semifinals of the Copa Libertadores 2010.

He never has played for the Chile national football team, but is a defender of extensive experience in Chilean football, with statistics such as: have scored at least one goal in every team that has played to date, having a total of 24 goals during 298 games in the Chilean Primera División and be one the players with more appearances in the first division of his country. Another relevant fact about González, is that started playing professionally recently at age 24 for Santiago Morning.

Club career

Early career
His professional debut came in the 1999 season at Santiago Morning, when he was 24, a late age for a good development in the football. Despite of this, he was an undisputed titular in the team and during his period at Morning was teammate of successful players in the Chilean football like Álvaro Ormeño, Gustavo Biscayzacú, Fernando Martel, Carlos Tejas, among others.

Successful under Raul Toro
In 2003, González left Morning for Deportes Temuco, team of the same level of his former club (first division). In the next season, he signed by Coquimbo Unido, team directed for the coach Raul Toro, who will influence too much in the career of the defender. His team reached advance to the finals of the 2005 Apertura Tournament, but was runner-up of the tournament, being defeated by Unión Española.

In January 2006, González followed to his coach Raul Toro and both signed by Audax Italiano. The squad was conformed by players of great technical quality like Carlos Villanueva, Roberto Cereceda, Boris Rieloff, Matías Campos Toro, among others. His team reached advance the finals of the 2006 Clausura Tournament, but again he and his team was defeated, now by Colo-Colo. In the next season, his team again nearly won the tournament, but was won by Colo-Colo, after of be eliminated in the playoffs semifinals of the Clausura Tournament 2007 by Universidad de Concepción.

In December 2007, Audax accepted a US$400.000 bid from Universidad de Chile for González, in a contract for the next three seasons.

Honours

Club
Universidad de Chile
Primera División de Chile (1): 2009 Apertura

External links
 
 

1975 births
Living people
Footballers from Santiago
Chilean footballers
Santiago Morning footballers
Deportes Temuco footballers
Coquimbo Unido footballers
Audax Italiano footballers
Universidad de Chile footballers
Deportes Iquique footballers
Universidad de Concepción footballers
Deportes Magallanes footballers
Magallanes footballers
Chilean Primera División players
Primera B de Chile players
Association football central defenders